This is a list of notable people from Varanasi, India.

Activists
Annie Besant
Dyal Singh Majithia

Arts, music and entertainment
Ashutosh Bhattacharya (1917–2004), Tabla Player
Girija Devi, Singer, Padma Vibhushan
Siddheshwari Devi, Khayal Singer, Padma Shri
Sitara Devi, Padma Shri
Bismillah Khan, Shehnai Player, Bharat Ratna Padma Vibhushan
Vikash Maharaj, Sarod Player, Yash Bharti
Birju Maharaj, Kathak Guru, Padma Vibhushan
Kishan Maharaj, Tabla Player, Padma Vibhushan                                                                                     
Channulal Mishra, Hindustani classical Player, Padma Bhushan
Shamta Prasad (Gudai Maharaj), Tabla Player, Padma Shri
Ritwik Sanyal, Singer, Dhrupad
Ravi Shankar, Sitar Player, Bharat Ratna
Shivnath Mishra, Sitarist, Surbahar
Uday Shankar, Dancer, Padma Vibhushan
Sujit Kumar, Actor & Producer
Anant Lal, Indian Classical Musician & Teacher
Rasoolan Bai, Vocalist
Ronu Majumdar, Flautist
Lalmani Misra, Musician
Hemanta Mukherjee, Singer, Music Director & Film Director
Deobrat Mishra, Sitar, Surbahar artist                                                         
Hiralal Yadav, Folk Singer, Padma Shri
Vidisha, Actress

Literature and academics
Baldev Upadhyaya, Hindi, Sanskrit scholar, literary historian, essayist and critic, Padma Bhushan
Bedhab Banarasi, Hindi writer
Bharatendu Harishchandra, Novelist, poet, playwright writer
Devaki Nandan Khatri, Writer
Gopinath Kaviraj (1887–1976), Sanskrit scholar; Principal Government Sanskrit College, Varanasi (1923–1937);Padma Vibhushan (1964)
Jaishankar Prasad, Writer
Kabir Das,  mystic poet and saint
Premchand, Hindi-Urdu Writer
Tulsidas, saint and poet, and philosopher
Vagish Shastri, Sanskrit scholar, Tantric, linguist and grammarian
Veer Bhadra Mishra, founding president of the Sankat Mochan Foundation; former professor and HOD of Civil Engineering at IIT (BHU), Varanasi
Sudama Panday 'Dhoomil', Poet
Shiv Prasad Mishra, Writer
Shiv Prasaad Singh, Writer
Kashi Nath Singh, Writer
Shiv Prasad Gupta freedom fighter, philanthropist and founder of Kashi Vidyapeeth. 
Charu Sheel Singh, Writer
Premendra Mitra, Bengali Poet & Novelist
Deviprasad Dwivedi, Writer & Teacher, Padma Bhushan
Harihar Kripalu Tripathi, Sanskrit Scholar, Padma Bhushan
Namvar Singh, Indian Literary Critic, Sahitya Akademi winner
Ashok Dhawan, MLA, Uttar Pradesh

Politics
Raghunath Singh First Member of Parliamnt Varanasi 
Devendra Nath Dwivedi, Governor designate of Gujarat
Mahendra Nath Pandey, Former HRD Minister of Gujarat
Sri Prakasa, Governor of Assam
Sampurnanand, Former Chief Minister of UP and Former Governor of Rajasthan
Kamalapati Tripathi, Writer, Freedom Fighter and Former Railway Minister
Raj Narain, former freedom fighter, royalty and politician. 
Veena Pandey, Former MLC, Uttar Pradesh
Adya Prasad Pandey, Former Vice Chancellor Manipur University, Professor, Banaras Hindu University
 Ajay Rai 5 times MLA from Pindra

Royalty
 Raja Chait Singh Zamindar of Benaras
 Kashi Naresh Maharaja Banaras Vibhuti Narayan Singh 
 Maharani Kiran Rao, Queen of Bhopal
Maharani Lakshmibai, Queen of Jhansi

Scientists
Bishun Khare, Research Scientist
Arvind Mohan Kayastha, Biologist
Sanjaya Rajaram, Plant Biologist
Subhash Chandra Lakhotia, Cytogenetist and Biologist

Sports
Prashanti Singh, Basketball Player
Mohammed Shahid, Hockey Player
Lalit Upadhyay, Field Hockey Player
Vishesh Bhriguvanshi, Basketball Player
Ram Singh Yadav, Marathon
Narsingh Pancham Yadav, Wrestler
Bernard Brodhurst, Cricketer
Maharajkumar of Vizianagram, Cricketer
Divya Singh, Basketball Player
Akanksha Singh, Basketball Player
Pratima Singh, Basketball Player
Punam Yadav, Weightlifter
Shivpal Singh, Track and Field

Others
Bhagwan Das, Bharat Ratna
K. L. Shrimali, Padma Vibhushan
Lahiri Mahasaya, Yogi
Rai Krishnadasa, Padma Vibhushan
Ravidas
Sameer, Lyricist
Sir James Brooke, Founder of the White Rajah dynasty of Sarawak
Sunil Bansal, Politician
Arun Pathak, Activist and Politician
Ekta Chowdhry, Model
Tapan Singhel, Managing Director and CEO of Bajaj Allianz General Insurance
Sitaram Chaturvedi, Educator, Dramatist and Scholar
Sachindra Nath Sanyal, Revolutionary and founder of Hindustan Republican Association
Manmath Nath Gupta, Revolutionary and Author

References

Varanasi
 
Varanasi
People